The 2007–08 A1 Grand Prix season was the third in the relatively short history of the championship and was won by Team Switzerland.

Teams 

All teams used same A1 Grand Prix car including Zytek-powered, Cooper Avon-shod and Lola A1GP chassis. The following 22 teams are competitors in the 2007–08 championship :

Swiss drivers Rahel Frey and Natacha Gachnang are the two first females to drive A1 Grand Prix cars this season. Their first steps were test drivers during Silverstone, September 18–19, 2007, test session. Then Natacha Gachnang drove in rookie sessions in Czech round, on October 12, 2007 and Rahel Frey in Malaysian rookie sessions, on November 23, 2007

Since January 2008, the Performance Racing manage A1 Team Indonesia. Bagoes Hermanto, brother of Satrio Hermanto, became the new Team Principal.

Season calendar and winners 
All 2006-07 A1 Grand Prix circuits were returned to 2007–08 A1 Grand Prix season with an exception of Beijing and Sentul rounds.

Due to Zandvoort's noise restriction, Netherlands round wasn't able to conduct Friday sessions and so rookie session. Saturday morning was dedicated to practice sessions and Saturday afternoon to qualify sessions for each Sunday race.

Tests

Rule changes
Qualifying will remain the current format, however the first two qualifying sessions will determine the grid for the sprint race while the second two qualifying sessions will determine the grid for the feature race.
There are now 2 pit stops required in the feature race.
The feature race remains a distance of 69 minutes plus one lap, while the sprint race has increased to 29 minutes plus one lap.
Points are now assigned in the same manner for both the sprint and feature races using the following format with one bonus point awarded for the fastest lap in each race.
Prize awarded in both sprint and feature races.

Since round 5, in Taupo, a 30 per cent biofuel mix was introduce. This environmental initiative is the first initiative to help reduce its environmental footprint in motorsport series. The new fuel is an ethanol-based product Hiperflo E30 sourced from sugar beet in Europe and produced by Petrochem Carless. The prediction are a CO2 emissions reduction by 21% per car.

A new light close to the entry of pit lane is introduce since round 5, in Taupo when safety car is out. When the lights are on, drivers can pit but it is not counted as one of the two mandatory stops. Pits are allowed for mechanical work to be carried out.

Standings

References

External links 

 A1GP official web-site
 A1GP online

 
A1 Grand Prix season
A1 Grand Prix season
A1 Grand Prix
A1 Grand Prix